Live 99 is a live album by Australian singer songwriter James Reyne. The album was recorded in 1999, during the promotional tour of the album Design for Living. The album was originally included as a bonus disc on the limited edition of that album. Following Reyne receiving the Medal of the Order of Australia (OAM) in 2014, the album was re-issued as a separate album.

Reyne toured the album throughout Victoria, Australia in April 2014.

Track listing
 DD
 "Fall of Rome" - 5:26		
 "Ferris Wheel" - 3:51		
 "Harvest Moon" - 4:20		
 "Take a Giant Step" - 4:59		
 "Land of Hope and Glory"- 4:08		
 "Any Day Above Ground" - 3:28		
 "Heaven on a Stick" - 4:22		
 "Slave" - 3:52		
 "Some People" - 4:53		
 "Water Water" - 5:05

Release history

References

James Reyne albums
2014 live albums
Live albums by Australian artists